Al-Shaykh Badr (also spelled Sheikh Bader) is a city in Syria, administratively belonging to Tartus Governorate. Al-Shaykh Badr has an altitude of 536 meters. As of 2008, it had a population of 47,982. Its inhabitants are predominantly Alawites.

The town is named after the shrine of a holy man, Shaykh Badr, located within it, which was venerated by Alawites and other local religious communities.

Climate 
The city has hot-summer Mediterranean climate with warm-dry summers and semi cold-rainy winters. The average annual rainfall reaches 1291mm (50.83 in).
<div style="width:75%>

References

Bibliography

Cities in Syria
Populated places in Al-Shaykh Badr District
Alawite communities in Syria